Maroharatra is a town and commune in Madagascar. It belongs to the district of Ifanadiana, which is a part of Vatovavy-Fitovinany Region. The population of the commune was estimated to be approximately 10,000 in 2001 commune census. 

Only primary schooling is available. According to a 2001 census, the majority 99% of the population of the commune are farmers.  The most important crops are coffee and rice, while other important agricultural products are bananas and cassava. Services provide employment for 1% of the population.

References and notes 

Populated places in Vatovavy-Fitovinany